Nujeh Deh-e Kuh (also Romanized as Nūjeh Deh-e Kūh) is a village in Qurigol Rural District, in the Central District of Bostanabad County, East Azerbaijan Province, Iran. At the 2006 census, its population was 700, in 108 families.

References 

Populated places in Bostanabad County